The Lok Sin Tong Benevolent Society, Kowloon or commonly known as Lok Sin Tong is charity organisation in Hong Kong.

History
In the mid 19th century, there was a market outside Kowloon Walled City.  To maintain a fair trade, a group of local Chinese set up a common scale and collected service charges from users for charity services such as free medical consultation and burial services. In 1880, the Lok Sin Tong Benevolent Society, Kowloon was officially registered as a charity organisation.

In the late 19th Century, with the outbreak of plague, the Society set up a free graveyard at Fei Ngo Shan to bury the poor dead. In 1927, it founded a first free school for girls. Since then its service has expanded into education, social welfare and medical care. It is a diversified social organization.

Schools

Secondary schools
Lok Sin Tong Ku Chiu Man Secondary School
Lok Sin Tong Leung Chik Wai Memorial School
Lok Sin Tong Leung Kau Kui Secondary School
Lok Sin Tong Wong Chung Ming Secondary School
Lok Sin Tong Young Ko Hsiao Lin Secondary School
Lok Sin Tong Yu Kan Hing Secondary School
Lok Sin Tong Leung Kau Kui College

External links

Official website